Dukes of Melrose is an American reality documentary television series on Bravo and premiered on March 6, 2013. The series chronicles the daily operations at the couture store, Decades. The boutique is owned by Christos Garkinos and Cameron Silver, who are known for their vintage and glamorous clothing.

Episodes

References

External links

2010s American reality television series
2013 American television series debuts
English-language television shows
Bravo (American TV network) original programming
2013 American television series endings